The National Irrigation Administration (NIA) is a Philippine government-owned and controlled corporation primarily responsible for irrigation development and management in the country.

History
NIA was created under Republic Act (RA) 3601 on June 22, 1963. Its charter was amended by Presidential Decree (PD) 552 on September 11, 1974, and PD 1702 on July 17, 1980. Both increased the capitalization and broadened the authority of the Agency.

NIA's forerunner was the Irrigation Division of the defunct Bureau of Public Works. NIA was placed under the Office of the President (OP) upon its creation. It was attached to the Department of Public Works, Transportation, and Communication under PD No.1, dated September 23, 1972. The issuance also integrated all irrigation activities under the Agency. The Administrative Code of 1987, dated July 25, 1987, attached NIA to both the Department of Public Works and Highways (DPWH), and Department of Agriculture (DA). But NIA remained attached to DPWH. It was transferred to OP pursuant to Executive Order No. 22, dated September 14, 1992. Then, it was attached to DA under Administrative Order No. 17, dated October 14, 1992.

Executive Order No. 165, Transferring the National Food Authority, National Irrigation Administration, Philippine Coconut Authority, and Fertilizer and Pesticide Authority to the Office of the President, May 5, 2014. Memorandum Order No. 70, Providing for the functions of the Presidential Assistant for Food Security and Agricultural Modernization, May 5, 2014.

Memorandum from the Executive Secretary - Office of the President, the Secretary of the Office of the Cabinet Secretary was designated Acting Chairperson of the NIA Board of Directors, November 3, 2016.

On April 25, 2022, President Rodrigo Duterte transferred back NIA to the Department of Agriculture by virtue of Executive Order No. 168.

See also
 Agriculture in the Philippines

References

External links

Government-owned and controlled corporations of the Philippines
Government agencies of the Philippines
Companies based in Quezon City
Government agencies established in 1963
Water management authorities